Udaya Dharmawardhana is a Sri Lankan film director, producer, screenwriter, cinematographer and editor. He created several music videos and TV advertisements . He also co-directed the feature film How I Wonder What You Are.

Biography
Udaya Dharmawardhana , began his career as an artistic photographer and he continued his desire to see the world around him through the frame, by becoming a videographer and shortly then cinematographer. After working as a program producer in a leading TV station in Sri Lanka for few years, he became one of the most prominent music video directors in the country who severely contributed to form a music video art in Sri Lanka taking it into a new approach. Udaya, still contributing himself with a lot of alternative films and short film productions has become an inspiring personage among his contemporaries and upcoming young artists in Sri Lanka. Udaya's visual style and his inspirations are mostly attached with urban experiences. The hardship he experienced himself in the city have helped him with better understanding of the alienated young lives within urban surroundings. One of the results was 'How I Wonder What You Are' (2009) Udaya's debut feature written and directed with his colleague Chinthana Dharmadasa. It gained much recognition and well-received from the critics for its controversial narrative and its poetic visual as well. He also the co-director of photography in 'How I Wonder What You Are'. 
"Miles of a Dream is his first solo directorial feature film, which is a co production of France and Sri Lanka. The film is based on the psychology of pain and suffers, on that point where we think that the approaching option is the salvation, where we step into the next closest thing without even having logical thought or evaluation about matters and where we take decisions blindly.

Filmography

How I Wonder What You Are (2009)

Miles of a Dream (2013)

References

External links
 Udaya Dharmawardhana on Youtube

Living people
Sri Lankan film directors
Year of birth missing (living people)